Jan van de Velde the younger (1593 – ca. 1 November 1641) was a Dutch Golden Age painter and engraver of animal, landscape and still-life subjects. He was the son of Jan van de Velde the Elder and the father of the still life painter Jan Jansz van de Velde.

Biography
Van de Velde was born in either Delft or Rotterdam, to calligrapher Jan van de Velde the Elder from Antwerp and Maijcken Van Bracht from Turnhout. He was apprenticed to engraver Jacob Matham in 1613, entered the Haarlem guild in 1614, and then probably visited Italy.  He is better known for his etching and engraving than for his painting. According to Houbraken, he was the brother of Esaias van de Velde and Willem van de Velde the Elder, but according to John Denison Champlin, Esaias was his cousin, and he was no relation at all to the family of Willem.  He died in Enkhuizen.

Drawings of Haarlem
In 1616, he drew several scenes of Haarlem as a series of 26 landscape prints. The success of this venture led him to expand it thirty years later to 60 prints, most of which are in the possession of the North Holland Archives. In the archives are also a few prints from a series of 12 local landscapes by Esaias, which indicates that they may have collaborated on this project.

Upon the death of his publisher, his works were offered for sale in 1674 in an advertisement in the Haarlems Dagblad:

References

Oeuvre of Jan van de Velde by Johan Philip van der Kellen and Daniel Franken, F. Muller & Co., 1883

External links
Vermeer and The Delft School, a full text exhibition catalog from The Metropolitan Museum of Art, which contains material on Jan van de Velde

Dutch engravers
People from South Holland
1593 births
1641 deaths
Dutch Golden Age painters
Dutch male painters